is a railway station on the Nippō Main Line operated by JR Kyushu in Ōita City, Ōita Prefecture, Japan.

Lines

Layout 
The station consists of an island platform serving two tracks at grade. The station building is a small modern concrete structure located on the island platform and is accessed by a footbridge which also serves as a free passage, linking streets on both sides of the track. A staffed ticket window is located inside the station building.

Management of the passenger facilities at the station has been outsourced to the JR Kyushu Tetsudou Eigyou Co., a wholly owned subsidiary of JR Kyushu specialising in station services. It staffs the ticket booth on the island platform which is equipped with a POS machine but does not have a Midori no Madoguchi facility.

Adjacent stations

History
The Kyushu Railway was nationalised on 1 July 1907. Japanese Government Railways (JGR), designated the track as the Hōshū Main Line on 12 October 1909 and expanded it southwards in phases. On the same day, Takajō was opened as an intermediate station on the new track. On 15 December 1923, the Hōshū Main Line was renamed the Nippō Main Line. With the privatization of Japanese National Railways (JNR), the successor of JGR, on 1 April 1987, the station came under the control of JR Kyushu.

JR Kyushu had planned to convert Takajō (with several other stations in Ōita City) into an unstaffed, remotely-managed "Smart Support Station" by 17 March 2018 but after opposition from users, this was postponed, pending works to improve accessibility.

Passenger statistics
In fiscal 2016, the station was used by an average of 1,800 passengers daily (boarding passengers only), and it ranked 102nd among the busiest stations of JR Kyushu.

See also
List of railway stations in Japan

References

External links

  

Railway stations in Ōita Prefecture
Railway stations in Japan opened in 1914
Ōita (city)